Yerkes Observatory is an astronomical observatory located in Williams Bay, Wisconsin, United States. The observatory was operated by the University of Chicago Department of Astronomy and Astrophysics from its founding in 1897 to 2018. Ownership was transferred to the non-profit Yerkes Future Foundation (YFF) in May 2020, which began restoration and renovation of the historic building and grounds. Re-opening for public tours and programming began May 27, 2022.  

The observatory, often called "the birthplace of modern astrophysics," was founded in 1892 by astronomer George Ellery Hale and financed by businessman Charles T. Yerkes. It represented a shift in the thinking about observatories, from their being mere housing for telescopes and observers, to the early-20th-century concept of observation equipment integrated with laboratory space for physics and chemistry analysis. 

The observatory's main dome houses a  doublet lens refracting telescope, the largest refractor ever successfully used for astronomy.  Two smaller domes house 40-inch (102 cm) and 24-inch (61 cm) reflecting telescopes. There are several smaller telescopes – some permanently mounted – that are primarily used for educational purposes. The observatory also holds a collection of over 170,000 photographic plates.

The Yerkes 40-inch was the largest refracting-type telescope in the world when it was dedicated in 1897, although there had been several larger reflecting telescopes. During this time, there were many questions about the merits of the various materials used to construct and design telescopes. Another large telescope of this period was the Great Melbourne Telescope, which was a reflector. In the United States, the Lick refractor had just a few years earlier come online in 1888 in California with a 91 cm lens. 

Prior to its installation, the telescope on its enormous German equatorial mount was shown at the World's Columbian Exhibition in Chicago during the time the observatory was under construction.

The observatory was a center for serious astronomical research for more than 100 years. By the 21st century, however, it had reached the end of its research life.  The University of Chicago closed the observatory to the public in October 2018. In November 2019, "an agreement in principle" was announced that the university would transfer Yerkes Observatory to the non-profit Yerkes Future Foundation (YFF).  The transfer of ownership took place on May 1, 2020.

Telescopes

In the 1860s Chicago became home of the largest telescope in America, the Dearborn  refractor. Later surpassed by the U.S. Naval Observatory's 26 inch, which would go on to discover the moons of Mars in 1877, there was an extraordinary increase of larger telescopes in finely furnished observatories in the late 1800s. In the 1890s various forces came together to establish an observatory of art, science, and superlative instruments in Williams Bay, Wisconsin.

The telescope was surpassed by the Harvard College Observatory,  reflector less than ten years later, although it remained a center for research for decades afterwards. In addition to the large refractor, Yerkes also conducted a great amount of Solar observations.

Background
Yerkes Observatory's 40-inch (102 cm)  refracting telescope has a doublet lens produced by the optical firm Alvan Clark & Sons and a mounting by the Warner & Swasey Company. It was the largest refracting telescope used for astronomical research. In the years following its establishment, the bar was set and tried to be exceeded; an even larger demonstration refractor, the Great Paris Exhibition Telescope of 1900, was exhibited at the Paris Universal Exhibition of 1900. 

However, this was not much of a success and was dismantled, and it did not become part of an active University observatory. The mounting and tube for the 40-inch telescope was exhibited at the 1893 World's Columbian Exposition in Chicago before being installed in the observatory. The grinding of the lens was completed later.

The 40-inch aperture refractor

The glass blanks for what would become Yerkes Great Refractor were made in Paris, France by Mantois and delivered to Alvan Clark & Sons in Massachusetts where they were completed. Clark then made what would be the largest telescope lens ever crafted and this was mounted to an Equatorial mount made by Warner & Swasey for the observatory. The telescope had an aperture of 40 inches (~102 cm) and focal length of 19.3 meters, giving it a focal ratio of f/19. 

The lens, an achromatic doublet which has two sections to reduce chromatic aberration, weighed 225 kilograms, and was the last big lens made by Clark before he died in 1897. Glass lens telescopes had a good reputation compared to speculum metal and silver on glass mirror telescopes, which had not quite proven themselves in the 1890s. For example, the Leviathan of Parsonstown was a 1.8 meter telescope with a speculum metal mirror, but getting good astronomical results from this technology could be difficult, and another large telescope of this period was the Great Melbourne Telescope in Australia, also a metal mirror telescope.

Some of the instruments for the 40-inch refractor (circa 1890s):
Filar Micrometer
Solar spectrograph
Spectroheliograph
Stellar spectrograph
Photoheliograph

The 40-inch refractor was modernized in the late 1960s with electronics of the period. The telescope was painted, the manual controls were removed, and electric operations were added at this time. This included nixie tube displays for its operation.

The 41-inch reflector

In the late 1960s a 40-inch reflecting telescope was added. The 41 inch was finished by 1968, with overall installation completed by December 1967 and the optics in 1968. While the telescope has a clear aperture of 40-inches, the mirror's physical diameter measures 41-inches leading to the telescope usually being called the "41 inch" to avoid confusion with the 40 inch refractor.
The mirror is made from low-expansion glass. The glass used was CER-VII−R.

The launch instruments for the 41 inch reflector included:

 Image tube spectrograph
 photoelectric photometer
 photoelectric spectrophotometer

The 40-inch reflector is of the Ritchey-Chretien optical design. The 41-inch helped pioneer the field of adaptive optics.

Additional instruments and equipment

A 12-inch refractor was moved to Yerkes from Kenwood Observatory in the 1890s.
Two other telescopes planned for the observatory in the 1890s were a 12-inch aperture refractor and a 24-inch reflecting telescope. There was a heliostat mirror and a meridian room for a transit instrument.

A two-foot aperture reflecting telescope was manufactured at the observatory itself. The clear aperture of the telescope was actually 23.5 inches. The glass blanks were cast in France by Saint Gobain Glass Works, and then were figured (polished into telescopic shape) at the Yerkes Observatory. The 'Two foot telescope' used a roughly seven foot long skeleton truss made of aluminum.

At one point the Observatory had an IBM 1620 computer, which it used for three years. This was replaced with an IBM 1130 computer in the 1960s.

A Microphotometer was built by Gaertner Scientific Corporation, which was delivered in February 1968 to the observatory.

Later, there was another 24-inch reflecting telescope by Boller & Chivens. This was contracted in the early 1960s under direction of observatory director W. Albert Hiltner. This telescope was installed in one of the smaller Yerkes domes, and it is known to have been used for visitor programs. This was a design by Boller & Chivens with Cassegrain optical setup, with a 24-inch (61 cm) clear aperture and is on an off-axis equatorial mount.

A 7-inch (18 cm) diameter aperture Schmidt camera was also at Yerkes Observatory. 

The Snow Solar Telescope was first established at Yerkes Observatory, and then later moved in 1904 out to California. A major difficulty of these telescopes was dealing with heat from the Sun, and it was built horizontally, but led to a vertical solar tower design afterwards. Solar tower telescopes would be a popular style for solar observatories in the 20th century, and are still used in the 21st century to observe the Sun.

Another instrument was the Bruce photographic telescope. The telescope had two objective lens for photography, one doublet of 10 inches aperture and another of 6.5 inches; in addition there is a 5-inch guide scope for visual viewing. The telescope was constructed from funds donated in 1897. The telescope was mounted on custom designed equatorial, the result of collaboration between Yerkes and Warner & Swasey, especially designed to offer an uninterrupted tracking for long image exposures. The images were taken on glass plates about a foot on each side.

The Bruce astrograph lenses were made by Brashear with Mantois of Paris glass blanks, and the lenses were completed by the year 1900. The overall telescope was not completed until 1904, where it was installed in its own dome at Yerkes. 

The astronomer Edward Emerson Barnard's work with the Bruce telescope, with his niece Mary R. Calvert who worked as his assistant and computer, lead to the publication of a sky atlas using images taken with the instrument, and also a catalog of dark nebulae known as the Barnard catalog.

Dedication 

The Observatory was dedicated on October 21, 1897, and there was a large party with university, astronomers, and scientists.

Before the dedication a conference of astronomers and astrophysicists was hosted at Yerkes Observatory, and took place on October 18–20, 1897. This is noted as a precursor to the founding of the American Astronomical Society

Although dedicated in 1897, it was founded in 1892. Also, astronomical observations had started in the summer of 1897 before the dedication.

Research and observations

Research conducted at Yerkes in the last decade includes work on the interstellar medium, globular cluster formation, infrared astronomy, and near-Earth objects. Until recently the University of Chicago also maintained an engineering center in the observatory, dedicated to building and maintaining scientific instruments. In 2012 the engineers completed work on the High-resolution Airborne Wideband Camera (HAWC), part of the Stratospheric Observatory for Infrared Astronomy (SOFIA). 
Researchers also use the Yerkes collection of over 170,000 archival photographic plates that date back to the 1890s. The past few years have seen astronomical research largely replaced by educational outreach and astronomical tourism activities.

In June 1967, Yerkes Observatory hosted the to-date largest meeting of the American Astronomical Society, with talks on over 200 papers.

The Yerkes spectral classification (aka MKK system) was a system of stellar spectral classification introduced in 1943 by William Wilson Morgan, Philip C. Keenan, and Edith Kellman from Yerkes Observatory. This two-dimensional (temperature and luminosity) classification scheme is based on spectral lines sensitive to stellar temperature and surface gravity, which are related to luminosity (the Harvard classification is based on surface temperature). Later, in 1953, after some revisions of lists of standard stars and classification criteria, the scheme was named the Morgan–Keenan classification, or MK.

Research work of the Yerkes Observatory has been cited over 10,000 times.

In 1899, observations of Neptune's moon Triton were published, with data recorded using the Warner & Swasey micrometer. In 1898 and 1899, Neptune was at opposition.

In 1906, a star catalog of over 13,600 stars was published. Also, there was some important work on Solar research in the early years, which was of interest to Hale. He went on to the Snow Solar Telescope at Mount Wilson in California. This was first operated at Yerkes and then moved to California.

The asteroid was discovered on 2 December 1923 by Belgian–American astronomer George Van Biesbroeck at Yerkes Observatory, and it was named for astronomer George Ellery Hale of Yerkes Observatory fame. Some additional examples include 990 Yerkes, 991 McDonalda, and 992 Swasey around this time; many more minor planets would be discovered at the observatory in the following decades.

Notable staff and visitors

Notable astronomers who conducted research at Yerkes include Albert Michelson, Edwin Hubble (who did his graduate work at Yerkes and for whom the Hubble Space Telescope was named), Subrahmanyan Chandrasekhar (for whom the Chandra Space Telescope was named), Ukrainian-American astronomer Otto Struve, Dutch-American astronomer Gerard Kuiper (noted for theorizing the Kuiper belt, home to dwarf planet Pluto),
Nancy Grace Roman, NASA's first Chief of Astronomy (who did her graduate work at Yerkes), and the twentieth-century popularizer of astronomy Carl Sagan.

In May 1921, Albert Einstein visited Yerkes Observatory.

Directors of Yerkes Observatory:
2021–curr – Dennis Kois
2012–2018 – Doyal Al Harper (2nd time)
2001–2012 – Kyle M. Cudworth
1989–2001 – Richard G. Kron
1982–1989 – Doyal Al Harper
1974–1982 – Lewis M. Hobbs
1972–1974 – William Van Altena
1966–1972 – Charles Robert O'Dell
1963–1966 – William Hiltner
1960–1963 – William W. Morgan
1957–1960 – Gerard P. Kuiper (2nd time)
1950–1957 – Bengt Strömgren
1947–1950 – Gerard P. Kuiper
1932–1947 – Otto Struve
1903–1932 – Edwin B. Frost
1897–1903 – George Ellery Hale

The 2005 proposed development and preservation initiative

In March 2005, the University of Chicago announced plans to sell the observatory and its land on the shore of Geneva Lake. Two purchasers had expressed an interest: Mirbeau, an East Coast developer that wanted to build luxury homes, and Aurora University, which has a campus straddling the Williams Bay property. The Geneva Lake Conservancy, a regional conservation and land trust organization, maintained that it was critical to save the historic Yerkes Observatory structures and telescopes for education and research, as well as to conserve the rare undeveloped, wooded lakefront and deep forest sections of the  site.  On June 7, 2006, the university announced it would sell the facility to Mirbeau for US$8 million with stipulations to preserve the observatory, the surrounding , and the entire shoreline of the site. 

Under the Mirbeau plan, a 100-room resort with a large spa operation and attendant parking and support facilities was to be located on the  virgin wooded Yerkes land on the lakeshore—the last such undeveloped, natural site on Geneva Lake's  shoreline. About 70 homes were to be developed on the upper Yerkes property surrounding the historic observatory. These grounds had been designed more than 100 years previously by John Charles Olmsted, the nephew and adopted son of famed landscape architect Frederick Law Olmsted.  Ultimately, Williams Bay's refusal to change the zoning from education to residential caused Mirbeau to abandon its development plans.

In view of the public controversy surrounding the development proposals, the university suspended these plans in January 2007. The university's department of astronomy and astrophysics then formed a study group, including representatives from the faculty and observatory and a wide range of other involved parties, to plan for the operation of a regional center for science education at the observatory.  The study group began its work in February 2007 and issued its final report November 30, 2007. 
The report recommended creating a formal business plan to ensure the financial viability of the proposed science education center, establishing ownership of the proposed center before initiating plans for creating it, and forming a partnership between the University of Chicago and local interests to plan for the center. It also suggested that some lakefront and woods parcels could be sold for residential development.

Current status

In March 2018, the University of Chicago announced that it would no longer operate the observatory after October 1, 2018, and would be seeking a new owner. In May 2018, the Yerkes Future Foundation, a group of local residents, submitted an expression of interest to the University of Chicago with a proposal that would seek to maintain public access to the site and continuation of the educational programs. Transfer of operation to a successor operator was not arranged by the end of August, and the facility was closed to the general public on October 1. Some research activities continued at the Observatory, including access and use of the extensive historical glass plate archives at the site. Yerkes education and outreach staff formed a nonprofit organization – GLAS – to continue their programs at another site after the closing.  

In May 2019, the university continued to negotiate with interested parties on Yerkes's future, primarily with the Yerkes Future Foundation. It was announced in November 2018 that a sticking point has been the need to include the Yerkes family in the discussions. Mr. Yerkes's agreement in making his donation to the university transfers ownership "To have and to hold unto the said Trustees [of the University of Chicago] and their successors so long as they shall use the same for the purpose of astronomical investigation, but upon their failure to do so, the property hereby conveyed shall revert to the said Charles T. Yerkes or his heirs at law, the same as if this conveyance had never been made." For the closing, there was a new gate with a sign that read "Facilities Closed To The Public" from October 1, 2018. 

In 2022, the site was re-opened to visitors.

Gargoyle sculptures, location, and landscaping 

The Observatory grounds and buildings are renowned for more than the Great Refractor, but also sculptures and architecture. In addition, the landscaping is also famed for its design work by Olmstead. The observatory building was designed by architect Henry Ives Cobb, and has been referred to as being in the Beaux Arts style. The building is noted for its blend of styles and rich ornamentation featuring a variety of animal and mythological designs.

On the building there are various carvings including Lion gargoyle designs. There are also sculptures to represent various people that oversaw or supported construction of the telescope and the facility. The location is noted for a good and pleasant location by Lake Geneva. Although it does not have a high-altitude as preferred by modern observatories, it does have a lot of good weather, and was a considerable distance from the light and pollution of the City of Chicago. 

In 1888, Williams Bay had railway terminal added by Chicago & North Western Railroad; this provided access from the City of Chicago, and is one factor that increased the site's development in the following decades.

The editorial offices for The Astrophysical Journal were located at Yerkes Observatory until the 1960s.

The landscape was designed by the same firm that did New York Central park, the firm of Frederick Law Olmsted, and the grounds were noted at one point for having multiple state record trees. The tree plan design was developed in the 1910s under design from the Olmstead firm and with support of the observatory Director; the grounds included the following types of trees at that time: white fir, yellowwood tree, golden rain tree, European beech, fernleaf beech, Japanese pagoda tree, littleleaf linden, Kentucky coffeetree, ginkgo, cut-leaf beeches, and chestnut trees.

The original landscape plan was not completed by the 1897 dedication, and there was grading and construction of gravel roads under direction of the Olmstead design as late as 1908.

Contemporaries on debut of the Great Yerkes Refractor
 
 
 

A major contemporary for the Yerkes was the well regarded 36-inch Lick refractor in California. The Yerkes, although just 4 inches in aperture larger, meant an increase of 23% in light-gathering ability. Both telescopes had achromatic doublets by Alvan Clark.

Over the 19th century saw a transition in large telescope construction from refractor type to reflector type, with metal-film-coated glass mirrors tending to be used instead of difficult, older-style metal mirrors. The Yerkes was perhaps the greatest of the great refractors, the largest astronomical instrument in the traditional style of the 19th century refractor-based observatories. 

The Yerkes was not only the largest refractor, but was tied for being the largest telescope in the world with Paris Observatory reflector (48 inch, 122 cm) when it became operational in 1896.

*Note the Leviathan of Parsonstown was not used after 1890

Understanding atmosphere and trends of telescope building of the late 19th century puts the choice of a large refactor in perspective. Although there were some very large reflectors, the speculum mirrors they relied on reflected about 2/3 of the light and had high upkeep. A major breakthrough came in the middle of the 19th century with a technique for coating glass with a metal film. This process (silver on glass) eventually lead to some bigger glass reflectors. Silvering has its own issues, in that coating must be reapplied usually every 2 years or so depending on conditions, and also it must be done very thinly so as to not affect the optical properties of the mirror.

A large glass reflector (122 cm diameter glass mirror) was established in Paris by 1876, but problems with figuring of that mirror meant that the Paris Observatory's 122 cm telescope was not used and did not have a good reputation for viewing. The potential of metal coated glass became more apparent A.A. Common's 36 inch reflecting telescope by 1878. (this won an astrophotography award)

The Warner and Swasey equatorial mount was shown in Chicago at the 1893 Colombia Exhibition, before it was moved to the Observatory.

Largest telescopes (all types) in 1910

Legacy

By 1905, the largest telescope in the World was the Harvard 60-inch Reflector ( 1.524 m 60″) at Harvard College Observatory, USA. Then in 1908, Mount Wilson Observatory matched that size with a 60-inch reflector of their own, and throughout the 20th century, increasingly larger reflectors would be established, aided also by refinements to mirror technology vapor-deposited aluminum on low-thermal expansion glass, pioneered for the 200 inch (5 meter) Hale telescope of 1948. 

In the latter years of the 20th century, space observatories also marked a major advance, and somewhat less than a century after Yerkes, the Hubble Space Telescope, with a 2.4 meter reflector, was launched. Small refractors remain popular for astronomical photography, although issues with chromatic aberration were never really entirely solved for the lens. (Isaac Newton had solved this with the reflecting design, although the refractors are not without their merits.)

The renaissance-esque grounds and architecture, murals, and statues of the premiere 19th century great observatories, with their extraordinary great telescopes; the Yerkes facility was described as "castle-like". For example, the Yerkes Observatory was built on a 77-acre grounds, with artistically designed landscaping. The visually remarkable extremely long tubes and elaborate domes and mounts provided an egg of knowledge that astronomers and the public flocked to for knowledge about the stars. The Yerkes grounds have landscaping designed by Olmstead, for example. 

Great advancements such as astrophotography and the discovery of nebulas and different types of stars provided a major advance in this period. The importance of finely crafted mounts matched to a large aperture, harnessing the power of the basic equations of the telescopes design to bring the heavens into closer, brighter examination increased humankind's understanding of space and Earth's place in the Galaxy. Among the accomplishments, Kuiper discovered that Saturn's Moon Titan has an atmosphere.

See also
List of largest optical refracting telescopes
List of astronomical observatories
List of largest optical telescopes in the 20th century
List of largest optical telescopes in the 19th century
List of telescope types
Yerkes 41-inch reflector

References

External links

Official website
Save Yerkes 
Yerkes Study Group
Geneva Lake Conservancy
GLAS
Guide to the University of Chicago Yerkes Observatory Logbooks and Notebooks 1892-1988 at the University of Chicago Special Collections Research Center
Guide to the University of Chicago, Yerkes Observatory, Office of the Director Records 1891-1946 at the University of Chicago Special Collections Research Center

Astronomical observatories in Wisconsin
Research institutes of the University of Chicago
Buildings and structures in Walworth County, Wisconsin